The Tarahumara frog (Lithobates tarahumarae) is a species of frog in the family Ranidae found in Mexico and—formerly—the United States, where it is now regionally extinct. Its natural habitats are streams and plunge pools in canyons in oak and pine-oak woodland, and foothill thorn scrub and tropical deciduous forest in the Pacific coast tropical area. Permanent water is necessary for reproduction.

The decline of Tarahumara frog populations has many reasons and may include chytridiomycosis and introduced species.

The Tarahumara are a well-known indigenous tribe from the Copper Canyon of northern Mexico.

References

Lithobates
Amphibians of Mexico
Amphibians of the United States
Taxonomy articles created by Polbot
Amphibians described in 1917